Bermuda is scheduled to compete at the 2023 Pan American Games in Santiago, Chile from October 20 to November 5, 2023. This was Bermuda's 15th appearance at the Pan American Games, having competed at every Games since making its debut in 1967.

Competitors
The following is the list of number of competitors (per gender) participating at the games per sport/discipline.

Sailing

Bermuda has qualified 2 boats for a total of 2 sailors.

Men

Women

See also
Bermuda at the 2024 Summer Olympics

References

Nations at the 2023 Pan American Games
2023
2023 in Bermudian sport